was a master of the Chujō-ryū fighting style. He was a student of Toda Seigen and teacher to Itō Ittōsai (possibly also Sasaki Kojirō).

Cultural Influence
Kanemaki Jisai is a featured character within the Japanese manga series Vagabond, in which he is a primary figure of the series' "Kojirō Arc", raising Sasaki Kojirō from his very birth and training him throughout the latter's early adulthood.

References

Japanese swordfighters
1615 deaths
Year of birth uncertain